Pivdennyi Bridge may refer to:

 Pivdennyi Bridge (Dnipro), a bridge in Dnipro
 Pivdennyi Bridge (Kyiv), a bridge in Kyiv